Georges may refer to:

Places
Georges River, New South Wales, Australia
Georges Quay (Dublin)
Georges Township, Fayette County, Pennsylvania

Other uses
Georges (name)
Georges (novel), a novel by Alexandre Dumas
"Georges" (song), a 1977 song originally recorded by Pat Simon and covered by Sylvie Vartan
Georges (store), a department store in Melbourne, Australia from 1880 to 1995
Georges (Green Card character)

People with the surname
Eugenia Georges, American anthropologist
Karl Ernst Georges (1806–1895), German classical philologist and lexicographer, known for his edition of Latin-German dictionaries.

See also
École secondaire Georges-P.-Vanier, a high school in Hamilton, Ontario, Canada
École secondaire Georges-Vanier in Laval, Quebec, Canada
French cruiser Georges Leygues, commissioned in 1937
French frigate Georges Leygues (D640), commissioned in 1979
George (disambiguation)
Georges Creek (disambiguation)
Georges Creek Coal and Iron Company, in Maryland, US
Georges Creek Railroad, in Maryland, US
Georges Creek Valley, Maryland
Georges Creek and Cumberland Railroad, in Maryland, US
Georges Hall, New South Wales
Georges Head Battery, New South Wales
Georges Heights, New South Wales
Georges Island (disambiguation)
Georges Labit Museum, Toulouse, France
Georges Levy G.L.40, French amphibious biplane designed in 1917
Georges Leygues-class frigates of the French Navy
Georges Mill, Virginia
Georges P. Vanier Secondary School in Courtenay, British Columbia, Canada
Georges River College Hurstville Boys Campus, Sydney
Georges River National Park, Sydney
Georges Valentine (shipwreck), wrecked 1904 off the coast of Martin County, Florida
Georges Vanier Catholic School, Ottawa, Ontario
Georges Vanier Elementary School in Surrey, British Columbia, Canada
Georges Vanier Secondary School in Toronto, Ontario, Canada
Georges-Vanier (Montreal Metro), Montreal, Canada
Georgescu, a surname
Georgeson, a surname
Georgestown, St. John's, neighbourhood near the downtown of St. John's, Newfoundland and Labrador
Georgesville, Ohio
List of hurricanes named Georges